Cevdet Sümer (born 17 December 1922) was a Turkish equestrian. He competed in two events at the 1960 Summer Olympics.

References

External links
 

1922 births
Year of death missing
Turkish male equestrians
Olympic equestrians of Turkey
Equestrians at the 1960 Summer Olympics
Sportspeople from Istanbul